Acrophony (Greek: ἄκρος akros uppermost + φωνή phone sound) is the naming of letters of an alphabetic writing system so that a letter's name begins with the letter itself. For example, Greek letter names are acrophonic: the names of the letters α, β, γ, δ, are spelled with the respective letters:  (alpha),  (beta),  (gamma),  (delta).

The paradigm for acrophonic alphabets is the Proto-Sinaitic script and the succeeding Phoenician alphabet, in which the letter A, representing the sound , is thought to have derived from an Egyptian hieroglyph representing an ox, and is called "ox", ʾalp, which starts with the glottal stop sound the letter represents. The Latin alphabet is descended from the Phoenician, and the stylized head of an ox can still be seen if the letter A is turned upside-down: ∀. The second letter of the Phoenician alphabet is bet (which means "house" and looks a bit like a shelter) representing the sound [b], and from ālep-bēt came the word "alphabet"another case where the beginning of a thing gives the name to the whole, which was in fact common practice in the ancient Near East.

The Glagolitic and early Cyrillic alphabets, although not consisting of ideograms, also have letters named acrophonically.  The letters representing /a, b, v, g, d, e/ are named Az, Buky, Vedi, Glagol, Dobro, Est.  Naming the letters in order, one recites a poem, a mnemonic which helps students and scholars learn the alphabet: Az buky vedi, glagol’ dobro est’ means "I know letters, [the] word is good" in Old Church Slavonic.

In Irish and Ogham, letters were formerly named after trees, for example A was ailm (white fir), B was beith (birch) and C was coll (hazel). The rune alphabets used by the Germanic peoples were also named acrophonically; for example, the first three letters, which represented the sounds /f, u, þ/, were named fé, ur, þurs in Norse (wealth, slag/rain, giant) and feoh, ur, þorn in Old English (wealth, ox, thorn). Both sets of names probably stemmed from Proto-Germanic *fehu, *uruz, *thurisaz.

The Thai alphabet is learned acrophonically, each letter being represented pictorially in school-books (chicken, egg, buffalo, snake, bell, etc.).

Rudyard Kipling gives a fictional description of the process in one of his Just So Stories, "How the Alphabet was Made".

Modern radiotelephony and aviation uses spelling alphabets (the best-known of which is the NATO Phonetic Alphabet, which begins with Alfa, Bravo, Charlie, Delta...) in which the letters of the English alphabet are arbitrarily assigned words and names in an acrophonic manner to avoid misunderstanding.

Most notes of the solfege scalenamely re, mi, fa, sol, and laderive their names from the first syllable of the lines of Ut queant laxis, a Latin hymn.

See also
Alphabet effect
History of the alphabet
Logogram

References

Onomastics
Alphabets